Carl Björk may refer to:

 Carl Axel Björk (1880–1952), New Zealand whaler and goldminer
 Carl Björk (footballer, born 1992), Swedish footballer
 Carl Björk (footballer, born 2000), Swedish footballer

See also
 Carl Björkman (disambiguation)